Tepid Peppermint Wonderland: A Retrospective is a double compilation album by American psychedelic rock band The Brian Jonestown Massacre, released in 2004. The album is a best-of compilation spanning the band's career (with the exception of Strung Out in Heaven, due to legal issues).

Track listing
Disc one

Disc two

Personnel
The song "If Love Is the Drug" contains uncredited vocals by Josie Fluri of the musical group New Roman Times.

References

The Brian Jonestown Massacre albums
2004 compilation albums
Tee Pee Records albums